Saul Newbury (August 14, 1870 – February 1, 1950), of Chicago, Illinois, was a collector of classic postage stamps. He was so involved in Chicago philately that he was referred to as "Chicago's No. 1 Collector."

Collecting interests
Newbury concentrated on building up world-class and world-famous collections. These included his 1847-1869 issues of the United States, which won him the Grand Award at CIPEX (Centennial International Philatelic Exhibition) in 1947. He was also famous for his collection of classic Brazilian Bull's Eye stamps, plus a collection of classic stamps of Shanghai, China, plus another collection of postage stamps and history of the country of Colombia and stamps issued by its states.

Philatelic literature
Newbury was an advocate of philatelic research and encouraged others in their research. He financed the research of Stanley Bryan Ashbrook, which led to Ashbrook's publication in 1938 of his book The United States One-Cent Stamp of 1851-57.

Honors and awards
Newbury was named to the American Philatelic Society Hall of Fame in 1950.

Saul Newbury Award
The Saul Newbury Award was established by the Chicago Philatelic Society in his honor in 1945. The award was to be "presented annually to the Chicagoan who, over the years has contributed most to philately." The first person to receive the Saul Newbury Award was David Louis Lidman.

See also
 Philately
 Philatelic literature

References
 APS Hall of Fame – Saul Newbury Archived from the original on 19 June 2006

1870 births
1950 deaths
Philatelic literature
American philatelists
People from Chicago
American Philatelic Society